Dyana Jane Calub (born 28 November 1975) is an Australian former backstroke swimmer of the 2000s, who won the silver medal in the 4×100-metre medley relay at the 2000 Summer Olympics in Sydney.

Training at Kingscliff, New South Wales, Calub, first gained international selection after winning the 100- and 200-metre backstroke at the 2000 Australian Championships. At the Olympics, she combined with Leisel Jones, Susie O'Neill and Petria Thomas to register a silver medal in the 4×100-metre medley relay, trailing the Americans home by 3 seconds. In her individual events, Calub came seventh in the 100-metre backstroke and was eliminated in the heats of the 200m backstroke.

In 2001 at the 2001 World Aquatics Championships, Calub combined with Jones, Thomas and Sarah Ryan to win the 4×100-metre medley relay, the first time that Australia swimmers had defeated a United States team in the event at international competition.  This was repeated at the 2002 Pan Pacific Swimming Championships in Yokohama, where she combined with Jones, Thomas and Jodie Henry.  She also won two golds and a silver at the 2002 Commonwealth Games in Manchester. She retired at the end of 2002.  She also won a silver in the 100-metre backstroke at the Pan Pacific Championships, behind Natalie Coughlin.

See also
 List of Olympic medalists in swimming (women)

References 
 Retirement announcement

External links
 
 

1975 births
Living people
People from New South Wales
Australian female backstroke swimmers
Olympic swimmers of Australia
Swimmers at the 2000 Summer Olympics
Commonwealth Games silver medallists for Australia
Olympic silver medalists for Australia
Commonwealth Games gold medallists for Australia
World Aquatics Championships medalists in swimming
Medalists at the 2000 Summer Olympics
Olympic silver medalists in swimming
Commonwealth Games medallists in swimming
Swimmers at the 2002 Commonwealth Games
21st-century Australian women
Medallists at the 2002 Commonwealth Games